Small Heath railway station serves the areas of Small Heath and Sparkbrook in Birmingham, West Midlands, England. The station is managed by West Midlands Trains, which runs all the services.

The A45 Small Heath Highway runs alongside. To the other side is the site of the former BSA factory. Nearby are the largely disused sidings which served local industry in the area.  

The station once had four platforms (both in an island configuration) in use, following the quadrupling of the line by the Great Western Railway in 1906, but only the western pair are now operational (as these are the only ones that trains can use to reach Moor Street & Snow Hill).

Services
Mondays to Saturdays, daytime service is generally two trains per hour outside peak times.

Northbound, there are two trains per hour to Birmingham Snow Hill. Most trains continue to Stourbridge Junction, Kidderminster or Worcester.

Southbound, there is one train per hour to Dorridge via Solihull and one train per hour to Whitlocks End via Shirley.
London Midland proposed the closure of the ticket office. The request has been denied.

References

External links

Rail Around Birmingham and the West Midlands: Small Heath railway station
Warwickshire Railways page

Railway stations in Birmingham, West Midlands
DfT Category E stations
Former Great Western Railway stations
Railway stations in Great Britain opened in 1863
Railway stations served by West Midlands Trains
Small Heath, Birmingham